Fernando Cicero, better known as Nando Cicero (22 January 1931 – 30 July 1995), was an Italian film director, screenwriter and actor.

Born in Asmara, Cicero debuted as an actor, working with directors such as Luchino Visconti (Senso, 1953), Roberto Rossellini (Vanina Vanini, 1961), Francesco Rosi (Salvatore Giuliano, 1962) and Alberto Lattuada (La steppa, 1962). He starred in eleven films between 1953 and 1962, always in supporting roles. After his directorial debut with Lo scippo he directed three Spaghetti Western films ( Professionals for a Massacre, Last of the Badmen, and Twice a Judas). From 1970 he focused on comedy genre, directing some parody films starred by Franco and Ciccio. Starting with The School Teacher Cicero established himself as one of the most important and successful directors of the commedia sexy all'italiana film genre. Following the decline of the genre, he retired in 1983; his last film was Paulo Roberto Cotechino, starring Alvaro Vitali and Carmen Russo. He died in 1995 at age 64.

References

External links 
 

1931 births
1995 deaths
Italian film directors
20th-century Italian screenwriters
Italian male film actors
People from Asmara
20th-century Italian male actors
Italian male screenwriters
20th-century Italian male writers
Comedy film directors
Parody film directors
Italian parodists